The Vinton Furnace State Experimental Forest and Raccoon Ecological Management Area (REMA) is a state forest in Vinton County, Ohio, United States. It comprises 15,849 acres, the largest remaining intact block of forest in Ohio still available for permanent protection. Since 2000, data collected at the forest has been cited in nearly 200 academic articles.

References

External links
 U.S. Geological Survey Map at the U.S. Geological Survey Map Website. Retrieved November 22nd, 2022.

Ohio state forests
Research forests
Protected areas of Vinton County, Ohio